The 2022 Atlantic Coast Conference baseball tournament will be held from May 24 through 29 at Truist Field in Charlotte, North Carolina. The annual tournament will determine the conference champion of the Division I Atlantic Coast Conference for college baseball. The tournament champion, will receive the league's automatic bid to the 2022 NCAA Division I baseball tournament.

The tournament has been held every year but two since 1973, with Clemson winning ten championships, the most all-time. Georgia Tech has won nine championships, and Florida State has won eight titles since their entry to the league in 1992. Recent entrants Virginia Tech, Boston College, Pittsburgh, Notre Dame and Louisville have never won the event.

Format and seeding
The winner of each seven team division and the top ten other teams based on conference winning percentage, regardless of division, from the conference's regular season were seeded one through twelve.  Seeds one and two were awarded to the two division winners.  Teams were then divided into four pools of three teams each, with the winners advancing to single elimination bracket for the championship.

If a 1–1 tie were to occur among all three teams in a pool, the highest seeded team would have advanced to the semifinals. Because of this, seeds 5–12 must win both pool play games to advance to the single-elimination bracket, and seeds 1–4 must only win the game against the winner of the game between the other two teams in the pool to advance. For example, if the 12 seed beats the 8 seed in the first game, then the winner of the 12 seed versus 1 seed advances, and the 8 seed versus 1 seed game has no effect on which team advances.

The seeds were announced on May 21, after the final day of conference play.

Two-way tie broken by combined head-to-head records.
Three-way tie broken by combined head-to-head records.
If a tie remains after the first tiebreaker, the two-way tiebreaker is used.

Schedule and Results

Schedule 

Source:

Pool Play

Pool A

Pool B

Pool C

Pool D

Playoffs

Semifinals

Championship Game

All–Tournament Team 

Source:

References

2022 Atlantic Coast Conference baseball season
Atlantic Coast Conference baseball tournament
ACC baseball tournament
Baseball competitions in Charlotte, North Carolina
College baseball tournaments in North Carolina